Bharoana is a village in Sultanpur Lodhi tehsil of Kapurthala district in Punjab, India. It was affected by the floods with other villages of the tehsil in 2008.

References 

Villages in Kapurthala district